Alisa Adriana Reyes is an American actress, best known for three seasons that she appeared on Nickelodeon's All That (1994–97) and providing the voice of LaCienega Boulevardez in the Disney Channel original series, The Proud Family (2001–05) and its 2022 revival.

Career 
Reyes started modeling at the age of eight, and attended The Professional Performing Arts School, where she focused on musical theatre. In 1992, she appeared in Mariah Carey's music video for her single "Make It Happen." In 1994, Reyes became one of the original cast members of the Nickelodeon sketch comedy show All That.

After All That, Reyes was then cast in the NBC Saturday morning sitcom One World. She has also made guest appearances on HBO's Six Feet Under, Lifetime's Strong Medicine, PBS' The American Family, NYPD Blue, and Boston Public.

Reyes also provided the voice of LaCienega Boulevardez in the Disney Channel animated series The Proud Family from 2001 to 2005. She reprised the role in the series continuation The Proud Family: Louder and Prouder on Disney+.

Reyes also worked as a DJ for Playboy Radio on Sirius Satellite Radio and XM Satellite Radio (Channel 99) and as a host for PlayboyU online and on air shows.

Filmography 
 Da Jammies (2015) ... MoMo (voice, season 1)
 My Trip Back to the Dark Side (2012) Misty Rae
 My Trip to the Dark Side (2011) Misty Rae
 DaZe: Vol. Too (2009) (post-production) as Amy
 Players (formerly Pledge of Allegiance) (2002)
 Contradictions of the Heart (2006) (completed) .... Ellen
 4-Bidden (2007) Sydney
 "The Doorman" (2007) (TV, Seinfeld episode) Girl at Yoga Class
 Without a Trace Angelina Torres (1 episode, 2006)
 Freezerburn (2005)  Angie
 Cuts  Monica (1 episode, 2005)
 The Proud Family Movie (2005) (TV) (voice)  LaCienega Boulevardez
 The Proud Family  LaCienega Boulevardez (45 episodes, 2001–2005)
 Pledge of Allegiance (aka Red Zone) (2003) Rachel
 Six Feet Under  Julie (1 episode, 2004)
 A Sight for Sore Eyes (2004) Laura Sanchez
 ER (1 episode, 2003)
 Boston Public  Trina Sanchez (3 episodes, 2002)
 NYPD Blue  Luisa Salazar (1 episode, 2002)
 American Family Young Vangie Gonzalez / ... (5 episodes, 2002)
 Passions  Syd Valentine (10 episodes, 2002–2003)
 V.I.P. (1 episode, 2001)
 The Bold and the Beautiful Ginger (1 episode, 2001)
 Spyder Games (2001) Rocio Conejo (unknown episodes)
 One World Marci Blake (39 episodes, 1998–2001)
 Strong Medicine  Sonia (1 episode, 2000)
 All That (1994–1997, 2019–2020) Regular Performer (1994–1997), guest (2019–2020)
 The Proud Family Movie (2005) (TV) (performer: "Together Makes it Better")
 The John Kerwin Show Herself (1 episode, 2005) Herself
 The Making of A Sight for Sore Eyes (2003) Herself
 Search Party Celebrity Contestant (2 episodes, 2000)
 Figure It Out (1997) TV Series  Herself/panelist (1997)
 Reading Rainbow  Herself (1 episode, 1991)

References

External links 
 Alisa Reyes' Official Website
 

20th-century American actresses
21st-century American actresses
American child actresses
American film actresses
American television actresses
American voice actresses
Hispanic and Latino American actresses
Living people
Year of birth missing (living people)